is a Japanese rugby union player. He plays for the Japanese club Toyota Industries Shuttles in the Top League. He also plays rugby sevens for Japan's national rugby sevens team and was named in their 2016 Summer Olympics squad.

He captained the Japanese squad when they played at the 2014 Hong Kong Sevens and won the World Series Qualifier for the 2014–15 Sevens World Series. He was also a member of the squad that won the 2015 ARFU Men's Sevens Championships to qualify for the 2016 Summer Olympics.

References

External links 
 
 
 
 
 

1988 births
Living people
People from Mie Prefecture
Sportspeople from Mie Prefecture
Japanese rugby union players
Rugby sevens players at the 2016 Summer Olympics
Olympic rugby sevens players of Japan
Japanese rugby sevens players
Toyota Industries Shuttles Aichi players
Rugby union players at the 2014 Asian Games
Rugby union players at the 2018 Asian Games
Asian Games gold medalists for Japan
Asian Games silver medalists for Japan
Asian Games medalists in rugby union
Medalists at the 2014 Asian Games
Medalists at the 2018 Asian Games
Japan international rugby sevens players
Rugby union centres
Rugby union wings